The  is a kei car manufactured by the Japanese automaker Daihatsu as the successor to the original Mira. It was previewed by the "e:S" concept car at the 2009 Tokyo Motor Show. The car was introduced to the Japanese market in September 2011.

The moniker "e:S" stands for "Eco and Smart".



Overview 

In response to the recent rise in environmental awareness and low priced cars, the Mira e:S has been developed with the concept of "the third eco car". It is the mass production version of the "e:S" concept car.

The existing technology owned by Daihatsu was reviewed, and by using the "e:S technology", the fuel efficiency has been improved by 40% compared to the conventional engine by reducing the weight of the vehicle, improving the transmission, improving the engine, among others.

The engine improves combustion efficiency by improving the compression ratio and the injector spray atomisation, etc., and by using the "i-EGR system", the mechanical loss is reduced to the utmost by making improvements over details. Furthermore, by adopting cooperative control by the electronic throttle, the most efficient state is maintained according to the driving situation. The CVT also reduces emissions by increasing the efficiency of the oil pump and improves the power transmission efficiency by lowering the CVT control pressure. As a result, the engine load was also reduced by optimising the transmission gear ratio (high gearing).

The body is made streamlined while maintaining the safety and a comfortable ride. The weight reduction has been made to the interior parts such as thinning of resin parts such as instrument panels, seat frame and CVT for idling stop. The air resistance has been suppressed by improving the shape of the front corners and reducing the flow velocity under the floor, and the rolling resistance was also reduced by improving the aforementioned weight reduction, bearings and brakes.

The "Eco Idle" idling stop mechanism that is installed in some grades of the Move and Move Conte is also equipped as standard for all vehicles, but the system in Mira e:S is the world's first for CVT vehicles with petrol engines. In addition, by reducing the number of dedicated parts, it has achieved weight reduction and "compactification".

The Mira e:S is assembled at Daihatsu Motor Kyushu in Nakatsu, Ōita.

First generation (LA300; 2011) 

The first-generation Mira e:S was released on 20 September 2011. At the time of its introduction, it won the Good Design Award on 3 October 2011.

Both the Mira e:S, Pixis Epoch and Pleo Plus received a facelift on 19 August 2013.

Second generation (LA350; 2017) 

The second-generation Mira e:S was released on 9 May 2017, alongside the second-generation Pixis Epoch and Pleo Plus.

References

External links 

  (Mira e:S)
  (Pixis Epoch)
  (Pleo Plus)

Mira e:S
Cars introduced in 2011
2020s cars
Kei cars
Hatchbacks
Front-wheel-drive vehicles
All-wheel-drive vehicles
Vehicles with CVT transmission